Fragum is a genus of cockles, marine bivalve molluscs in the family Cardiidae. Members of the genus have characteristic thick, sculptured shells and live buried in sand, extending their siphons to the surface to feed and breathe. They are found in the Indo-Pacific region and the Red Sea.

Species
The genus includes the following species according to the World Register of Marine Species:
Fragum erugatum (Tate, 1889)
Fragum fragum (Linnaeus, 1758)
Fragum grasi Ter Poorten, 2009
Fragum mundum (Reeve, 1845)
Fragum nivale (Reeve, 1845)
Fragum scruposum (Deshayes, 1855)
Fragum sueziense (Issel, 1869)
Fragum unedo (Linnaeus, 1758)

References

Cardiidae
Bivalve genera